The men's hammer throw event at the 1998 Commonwealth Games was held on 18 September in Kuala Lumpur.

Results

References

Hammer
1998